Peter Carrington (birth unknown) is a former rugby union and professional rugby league footballer who played in the 1960s.

References

External links
Search for "Carrington" at rugbyleagueproject.org

Living people
English rugby league players
Place of birth missing (living people)
Rugby league hookers
Rugby union hookers
Warrington Wolves players
Year of birth missing (living people)